Liana Leota (née Barrett-Chase; born 31 October 1984) is a New Zealand netball player. She is a member of the national netball team, the Silver Ferns, and plays for Severn Stars in the British Netball Superleague.

Leota was a member of the Southern Sting in 2007, which won the National Bank Cup that year. She also played for the Waikato Bay of Plenty Magic in 2006 and the Western Flyers from 2003–2005. She continued playing in Invercargill with the Southern Steel in the new ANZ Championship, which started in 2008. That same year, Leota debuted in the Silver Ferns against Australia. Since her debut, she has cemented her position in the Silver Ferns' midcourt. For the 2010 ANZ Championship season, Leota received the Most valuable Player award.
Leota and Wendy Frew were named as co-captains of the Southern Steel for 2011.

She signed for Netball Superleague side Manchester Thunder for the 2016 Season on 27 October 2015. Following a championship winning season with Thunder, Leota signed for Severn Stars in September 2019 

She is of Ngāti Tūwharetoa and Ngāti Maniapoto descent.

References

External links 
 2011 Southern Steel profile 
 2011 ANZ Championship profile

1984 births
Living people
New Zealand netball players
New Zealand international netball players
Commonwealth Games medallists in netball
Commonwealth Games gold medallists for New Zealand
Netball players at the 2010 Commonwealth Games
Netball players at the 2014 Commonwealth Games
2011 World Netball Championships players
ANZ Championship players
Central Pulse players
Southern Steel players
Netball Superleague players
Manchester Thunder players
Severn Stars players
New Zealand expatriate netball people in England
Rugby union players' wives and girlfriends
New Zealand Māori netball players
Ngāti Tūwharetoa people
Ngāti Maniapoto people
People from Taihape
Southern Sting players
New Zealand international Fast5 players
Medallists at the 2010 Commonwealth Games
Medallists at the 2014 Commonwealth Games